Das Klown is a street/hardcore/punk band from Long Beach, California, formed in 1989. Known for their "In Your Face" punk style, Das Klown was one of the quintessential 90's SoCal punk bands. Singer AJ Ransdell is often seen performing in clown make-up and a red nose.

Members
AJ Ransdell - Vocals

Past members
Jayson Van Auken - Guitar
Jimbo T. - Guitar/Bass
Rikk Agnew - Guitar
Nate Light - Bass
Lantz Krantz - Drums
Nick Vit - Drums
Kevin Huddleson - Drums
Justin Parnell - Drums
Mike Christie - Guitar
Eric “Unusual” Helms - Guitar

Discography 
(*Note: Discography does not follow in any order)

Flipside
Das Klown (7-inch EP)

Posh Boy
Laughing Stalk (CD/LP)

Doctor Dream
Ha Ha Ha Ha Ha (7-inch EP)

Triple X
Rapid Fire  (CD)
Das Klown "#2" (7-inch EP)

Know Records
Das Klown/All Day split (7-inch EP)
Das Klown "Blow Yer Self" (7-inch EP)
Das Klown/Drain Bramaged split (7-inch EP)
Das Klown "Holy Crap!" (CD/LP) 
Das Klown "Sink Or Swim" (7-inch EP)
Das Klown "Live At Zed" (CD) 
What Were We Fighting for? (DK CD compilation)
Bite The Bullet (CD compilation)

Skunk/Long Beach Records
Long Beach Blvd (CD compilation)
When Punkers were Punk and Parents were Scared (CD compilation) Antidote (CD/LP) 
Secret Hate/Das Klown (7-inch EP)
Skunk Records Sampler Fall '98 (CD)
Skunk Records Sampler Spring '99 (CD)

See also 
Secret Hate
Falling Idols

Punk rock groups from California
Street punk groups
Culture of Long Beach, California
Musical groups established in 1989
Musical groups disestablished in 2005